Adrian Rochet (born on March 26, 1987) is an Israeli former footballer and current assistant-coach of Israeli club Ironi Kiryat Shmona.

Early and personal life
Rochet was born in kibbutz Sa'ar, Israel, to parents Alberto and Monica Rochet, and he is of Argentine-Jewish descent.

He was enlisted to the Israel Defense Forces and served as a soldier for three years.

He is married to his Israeli wife Galit Rochet since 2011; they have three children, and reside in kibbutz Neot Mordechai, Israel.

Honours

Club
 Hapoel Kiryat Shmona
Israeli Premier League: 2011–12
Israel State Cup: 2013–14
Israel Super Cup: 2015
Toto Cup Al: 2010–11, 2011–12
Toto Cup Leumit:  2006–07, 2009–10
Liga Leumit: 2006–07, 2009–10

See also
List of Jewish footballers
List of Jews in sports
List of Jews in sports (non-players)
List of Israelis

References

External links
Profile on One.co.il (Hebrew)

1987 births
Living people
Israeli footballers
Hapoel Ironi Kiryat Shmona F.C. players
Hapoel Nof HaGalil F.C. players
Hapoel Haifa F.C. players
Hapoel Acre F.C. players
Hapoel Petah Tikva F.C. players
Hapoel Ashkelon F.C. players
Hapoel Afula F.C. players
Hapoel Kfar Saba F.C. players
Israeli Premier League players
Liga Leumit players
Footballers from Northern District (Israel)
Association football midfielders
Israeli people of Argentine-Jewish descent
Israeli Jews